Georg Stoltze (13 February 1931 – 6 July 2007) was a German cyclist. He won the UCI Motor-paced World Championships in 1960 and finished in third place next year 1961.

Stoltze came from a cycling family. His grandfather, also named George, was one of the founders of the race round the Hainleite. His father, also Georg Stoltze, won a European title in 1928 along with his brother Walter. Stoltze junior was a versatile cyclist, winning more than 250 races on road and track during his career. After retirement he worked for the post office. He died in 2007 after a long illness.

References

1931 births
2007 deaths
German male cyclists
Sportspeople from Erfurt
East German male cyclists
People from Bezirk Erfurt
Cyclists from Thuringia
20th-century German people